John of Cornwall, in Latin Johannes Cornubiensis or Johannes de Sancto Germano was a Christian scholar and teacher, who was living in Paris about 1176.

He is not to be confused with the fourteenth-century John of Cornwall who expounded Latin at his grammar school in English instead of French. There was also an archdeacon of Worcester called John of Cornwall around 1197, who probably was a different person.

Life and writings
Little is known of his life. From his names, it is surmised that he was a native of St Germans in Cornwall. He studied with Peter Lombard in Paris, and wrote Eulogium ad Alexandrum Papam III, quod Christus sit aliquis homo, a treatise refuting Abelard's doctrine that the humanity of Jesus was only a garment clothing the Logos.

The Eulogium (dated 1176 or later) was printed by Edmond Martène in Thesaurus novus anecdotum (Paris, 1717), and by Jacques Paul Migne's in Patrologiae Latinae Cursus Completus (1844-1855), vol. CXCIX. Other books attributed to him are:

 Apologia de Christi Incarnatione (disputed authorship; perhaps by Hugh of St. Victor).
 Summa qualiter fiat Sacramentum Altaris per virtutem sanctae crucis et de septem canonibus vel ordinibus Missae. Migne, Patrologiae Latinae, vol. CLXXVII.
 Prophetia Merlini or Merlini prophetia cum expositione. A poem written between 1141 and 1155, known from a unique manuscript in the Vatican Library.
 De diuersa consuetudine legendi Sacram Scripturam. See Friedrich Stegmüller, Bibl. 4419; Richard Sharpe, Latin Writers, 229.

See also

 Busillis in the List of Latin phrases.
 An dhargan a Verdhin / The prophecy of Merlin, translated by Julyan Holmes. 2nd ed., Kesva an Taves Kernewek / The Cornish Language Board, Gwinear, 2001. . (full parallel English/Cornish text).

References

Michael J. Curley, "A New Edition of John of Cornwall's Prophetia Merlini."   Speculum 57 (1982): 217-249.
Michael Faletra, "Merlin in Cornwall: The Source and Contexts of John of Cornwall's Prophetia Merlini."  Journal of English and Germanic Philology 111 (2012): 304-338.

External links
 
 List of Identifications
 The town of St Germans in Cornwall

People from St Germans, Cornwall
Cornish-speaking people
Writers from Cornwall
Medieval Cornish people
English Benedictines
12th-century English Roman Catholic theologians
Benedictine theologians